PSOS, PSOs or pSOS may refer to:
 pSOS (real-time operating system)
 Provably Secure Operating System
 Project Support Open Source
 Protective services officers
 The Police Service of Scotland

See also
 pSOS+